Agnew is an unincorporated community in Clallam County, Washington, United States.  It lies on a backroad leading to Port Angeles and just outside Sequim.  Agnew is a primarily rural residential area located along the Strait of Juan de Fuca.

Agnew was first settled around 1875 by Charles Agnew.  Previously called "De Fuca" and "Wildcat Valley", it received its present name in 1920. It is a consolidation of the former towns of Reeveton and Lindsay.

Climate
This region experiences warm (but not hot) and dry summers, with no average monthly temperatures above 71.6 °F.  According to the Köppen Climate Classification system, Agnew has a warm-summer Mediterranean climate, abbreviated "Csb" on climate maps.

References

Unincorporated communities in Clallam County, Washington
Unincorporated communities in Washington (state)